There is no specific doctrinal view of Jesus in traditional Judaism. Monotheism, a belief in the absolute unity and singularity of God, is central to Judaism, which regards the worship of a person as a form of idolatry. Therefore, considering Jesus a deity would be forbidden according to Judaism. The rejection of Jesus as Messiah has never been a theological issue for Judaism because Jewish eschatology holds that the coming of the Jewish Messiah will be associated with events that had not occurred at the time of Jesus, such as the rebuilding of The Temple, a Messianic Age of peace, and the ingathering of Jews to their homeland.

Historically, some Jewish writers and scholars have considered Jesus as the most damaging "false prophet", and traditional views of Jesus have been mostly negative, though influential Jewish scholars of the Middle Ages including Judah Halevi and Maimonides viewed Jesus as an important preparatory figure for a future universal ethical monotheism of the Messianic Age.  Some modern Jewish thinkers starting in the 18th century with the Orthodox Jacob Emden and the reformer Moses Mendelssohn have sympathetically speculated that the historical Jesus may have been closer to Judaism than either the Gospels or traditional Jewish accounts would indicate, a view that is still espoused by some.

Judaism has never accepted any of the claimed fulfilments of prophecy that Christianity attributes to Jesus.

Background

The belief that Jesus is God, the Son of God, or a person of the Trinity, is incompatible with Jewish theology. Jews believe Jesus did not fulfill messianic prophecies that establish the criteria for the coming of the messiah. Judaism does not accept Jesus as a divine being, an intermediary between humans and God, a messiah, or holy. Belief in the Trinity is also held to be incompatible with Judaism, as are a number of other tenets of Christianity.

Jewish theology

Oneness and indivisibility of God

In Judaism, the idea of God as a duality or trinity is heretical — it is even considered by some polytheistic. According to Judaic beliefs, the Torah rules out a trinitarian God in Deuteronomy (6:4): "Hear Israel, the LORD is our God, the LORD is one."

Judaism teaches that it is heretical for any man to claim to be God, part of God, or the literal son of God. The Jerusalem Talmud states explicitly: "if a man claims to be God, he is a liar."

Paul Johnson, in his book A History of the Jews, describes the schism between Jews and Christians caused by a divergence from this principle:
To the question, Was Jesus God or man?, the Christians therefore answered: both. After 70 AD, their answer was unanimous and increasingly emphatic. This made a complete breach with Judaism inevitable.

In the 12th century, the preeminent Jewish scholar Maimonides codified core principles of Modern Judaism, writing "[God], the Cause of all, is one. This does not mean one as in one of a pair, nor one like a species (which encompasses many individuals), nor one as in an object that is made up of many elements, nor as a single simple object that is infinitely divisible. Rather, God is a unity unlike any other possible unity." Some Orthodox Jewish scholars note that the common poetic Jewish expression, "Our Father in Heaven", was used literally by Jesus to refer to God as "his Father in Heaven" (cf. Lord's Prayer).

God is not corporeal
Maimonides' 13 principles of faith includes the concept that God has no body and that physical concepts do not apply to him.  In the "Yigdal" prayer, found towards the beginning of the Jewish prayer books used in synagogues around the world, it states "He has no semblance of a body nor is He corporeal".  It is a central tenet of Judaism that God does not have any physical characteristics; that God's essence cannot be fathomed.

Jesus as the Jewish Messiah

Judaism's idea of the messiah differs substantially from the Christian idea of the Messiah. In orthodox Rabbinic Judaism the messiah's task is to bring in the Messianic Age, a one-time event, and a presumed messiah who is killed before completing the task (i.e. compelling all of Israel to walk in the way of Torah, repairing the breaches in observance, fighting the wars of God, building the Temple in its place, gathering in the dispersed exiles of Israel) is not the messiah. Maimonides states,

Jews believe that the messiah will fulfill the messianic prophecies of the prophets Isaiah and Ezekiel. Judaism interprets Isaiah 11:1 ("And there shall come forth a shoot out of the stock of Jesse, and a twig shall grow forth out of his roots.")  to mean that the messiah will be a patrilineal bloodline descendant of King David. He is expected to return the Jews to their homeland and rebuild the Temple, reign as king, and usher in an era of peace and understanding where "the knowledge of God" fills the earth, leading the nations to "end up recognizing the wrongs they did Israel". Ezekiel states the messiah will redeem the Jews.

The Jewish view of Jesus is influenced by the fact that Jesus lived while the Second Temple was standing, and not while the Jews were exiled. He never reigned as king, and there was no subsequent era of peace or great knowledge. Jesus died without completing or even accomplishing part of any of the messianic tasks, which Christians say will occur at a Second Coming. Rather than being redeemed, the Jews were subsequently exiled from Judea, and the Temple was destroyed years later, not rebuilt. These discrepancies were noted by Jewish scholars who were contemporaries of Jesus, as later pointed out by Nachmanides, who in 1263 observed that Jesus was rejected as the messiah by the rabbis of his time.

Moreover, Judaism sees Christian claims that Jesus is the textual messiah of the Hebrew Bible as being based on mistranslations, with the idea that Jesus did not fulfill any of the Jewish Messiah qualifications.

Prophecy and Jesus

According to the Torah ( and ), the criteria for a person to be considered a prophet or speak for God in Judaism are that he must follow the God of Israel (and no other god); he must not describe God differently from how he is known to be from Scripture; he must not advocate change to God's word or state that God has changed his mind and wishes things that contradict his already-stated eternal word. There is no concept of the Messiah "fulfilling the law" to free the Israelites from their duty to maintain the mitzvot in Judaism, as is understood in much of Christianity or some Messianic Judaism.

There are two types of "false prophet" recognized in the Hebrew Bible: the one who claims to be a prophet in the name of idolatry, and the one who claims to be a prophet in the name of the God of Israel, but declares that any word or commandment (mitzvah) which God has said no longer applies, or makes false statements in the name of God. As traditional Judaism believes that God's word is true eternally, one who claims to speak in God's name but diverges in any way from what God himself has said, logically cannot be inspired by divine authority. Deuteronomy 13:1 states simply, "Be careful to observe only that which I enjoin upon you; neither add to it nor take away from it."

Even if someone who appears to be a prophet can perform supernatural acts or signs, no prophet or dreamer can contradict the laws already stated in the Bible.  Thus, any divergence espoused by Jesus from the tenets of biblical Judaism would disqualify him from being considered a prophet in Judaism. This was the view adopted by Jesus' contemporaries, as according to rabbinical tradition as stated in the Talmud (Sotah 48b) "when Malachi died the Prophecy departed from Israel." As Malachi lived centuries before Jesus it is clear that the rabbis of Talmudic times did not view Jesus as a divinely inspired prophet. Furthermore, the Bible itself includes an example of a prophet who could speak directly with God and could work miracles but was "evil", in the form of Balaam.

Jesus and salvation

Judaism does not share the Christian concept of salvation, as it does not believe people are born in a state of sin. Judaism holds instead that man is born to strive for perfection, and to follow the word of God. 
Sin is then divided into two categories; transgression against God (through a failure to fulfill ritual obligations, such as not sanctifying the Sabbath), and transgression against man (through a failure to fulfill moral obligations, such as committing gossip). To gain absolution, a person can repent of that sin, regret the sin, and commit to never do the sin again. God will then forgive their transgression against Him. If a sin is committed against man, the person needs to gain forgiveness from the one he sinned against; it cannot be forgiven by God or another person.

Jesus in rabbinical literature

The Talmud

Various works of classical Jewish rabbinic literature are thought to contain references to Jesus, including some uncensored manuscripts of the Babylonian Talmud and the classical midrash literature written between 250 CE and 700 CE. There is a spectrum of scholarly views on how many of these references are actually to Jesus.

Christian authorities in Europe were largely unaware of possible references to Jesus in the Talmud until 1236, when a convert from Judaism, Nicholas Donin, laid thirty-five formal charges against the Talmud before Pope Gregory IX, and these charges were brought upon rabbi Yechiel of Paris to defend at the Disputation of Paris in 1240. Yechiel's primary defence was that the Yeshu in rabbinic literature was a disciple of Joshua ben Perachiah, and not to be confused with Jesus (Vikkuah Rabbenu Yechiel mi-Paris). At the later Disputation of Barcelona (1263) Nachmanides made the same point.

Jacob ben Meir (11th century), Jehiel ben Solomon Heilprin (17th century), and Jacob Emden (18th century) support this view, but not all rabbis took this view. The Kuzari by Yehuda Halevi, understood these references in Talmud as referring to Jesus of Nazareth based on evidence that Jesus of Nazareth lived 130 years prior to the date that Christians believe he lived. Profiat Duran's anti-Christian polemic Kelimmat ha-Goyim ("Shame of the Gentiles", 1397) makes it evident that Duran gave no credence to Yechiel's theory of two Jesuses.

Modern scholarship on the Talmud has a spectrum of views. From Joseph Klausner, R. Travers Herford and Peter Schäfer, who see some traces of a historical Jesus in the Talmud, to the views of Johann Maier and Jacob Neusner, who consider that there are little or no historical traces and texts have been applied to Jesus in later editing, to others such as Daniel Boyarin (1999), who argue that Jesus in the Talmud is a literary device used by Pharisaic rabbis to comment on their relationship to and with early messianic Jews.

The Vatican's papal bull issued in 1554 censored the Talmud and other Jewish texts, resulting in the removal of references to Yeshu. No known manuscript of the Jerusalem Talmud makes mention of the name, although one translation (Herford) has added it to Avodah Zarah 2:2 to align it with similar text of Chullin 2:22 in the Tosefta. In the Munich (1342 CE), Paris, and Jewish Theological Seminary of America manuscripts of the Talmud, the appellation Ha-Notzri is added to the last mention of a Yeshu in Sanhedrin 107b and Sotah 47a as well as to the occurrences in Sanhedrin 43a, Sanhedrin 103a, Berachot 17b and Avodah Zarah 16b-17a. Student, Zindler and McKinsey Ha-Notzri is not found in other early pre-censorship partial manuscripts (the Florence, Hamburg and Karlsruhe) where these cover the passages in question.

Although Notzri does not appear in the Tosefta, by the time the Babylonian Talmud was produced, Notzri had become the standard Hebrew word for Christian and the Yeshu Ha-Notzri found in the Talmud has become the controversial rendition of "Jesus the Nazarene" in Hebrew. For example, by 1180 CE the term Yeshu Ha-Notzri can be found in the Maimonides' Mishneh Torah (Hilchos Melachim 11:4, uncensored version).

In Sanhedrin 107b; Sotah 47a states that Jesus was sexually immoral and worshiped idols.

Toledot Yeshu
In the Toledot Yeshu the name of Yeshu is taken to mean yimakh shemo. In all cases of its use, the references are to Yeshu are associated with acts or behaviour that are seen as leading Jews away from Judaism to minuth, a term usually translated as "heresy" or "apostasy". Historically, the portrayals of Jesus in the Talmud and Jewish literature were used as an excuse for anti-Jewish sentiments.

Maimonides
Maimonides lamented the pains that Jews felt as a result of new faiths that attempted to supplant Judaism, specifically Christianity and Islam. Referring to Jesus, he wrote:
Concerning Jesus of Nazareth who imagined himself to become the Messiah and was put to death by the court, the Prophet Daniel said already: "also the rebellious sons of thy people will lift themselves up to establish the vision; but they will stumble." (Dan.11,14) And can there be a greater stumbling block than this: All the prophets affirmed that the Messiah would redeem Israel, save them, gather their dispersed and strengthen the commandments, but he caused Israel to be destroyed by the sword, their remnants to be dispersed, and humiliated, their changing the Torah, and misleading the world to serve gods besides the Lord.

Nonetheless, Maimonides continued, developing a thought earlier expressed in Judah Halevi's Kuzari,
Yet no man can grasp the thoughts of (the Lord) the Creator of the world, for our ways are not His ways, and our thoughts are not His thoughts; And all these ways of Jesus of Nazareth and of This Ismaelite who rose after him, were only to clear the way for Messiah the King." ... ." when the Messiah will really arise and he will succeed and will reign supreme, at once they shall all return and will know that they inherited lies from their forefathers and that their prophets and forefathers have misled them. (Hilkhot Melakhim 11:10–12.)

Epistle to Yemen
Jesus is mentioned in Maimonides' Epistle to Yemen, written about 1172 to Rabbi Jacob ben Netan'el al-Fayyumi, head of the Yemen Jewish community

In the context of refuting the claims of a contemporary in Yemen purporting to be the Messiah, Maimonides mentions Jesus again:

In Karaite Judaism
The historical view of Jesus within Karaite Judaism is a complex one. While Karaites share Rabbanite views in rejecting Christian beliefs of Jesus' divinity and claims to messiahship, Karaites throughout history have held warmer opinions about him. Karaite scholar Jacob Qirqisani stated that some Karaites of his day believed that: 

Persian historian and Islamic theologian Al-Shahrastani reported that Karaites believed that Jesus was indeed a righteous man, but was not a prophet, and that the Gospels were not divinely revealed, but created and compiled by Jesus and his disciples. Hakham Abraham Firkovich believed Jesus himself was actually a Karaite. Controversial hakham Seraya Shapshal said:

As a Nazarene

In addition to being a place-name, Nazarenes were Jews who committed to certain extreme observances of religious practice, such as shaving their heads and abstaining from various activities, foods or practices, spending time in contemplation in the desert and so on.

According to their website, they continue being recognized as Jews, and Jesus lived around 130 or 140 CE and was conflated with Neoplatonic beliefs into what became the New Testament. To them, Jesus is a teacher, in the tradition of other Jewish teachers, and was not God or God's son.

Positive historical re-evaluations
Considering the historical Jesus, some modern Jewish thinkers have come to hold a more positive view of Jesus, arguing that he himself did not abandon Judaism and/or that he benefited non-Jews. Among historic Orthodox rabbis holding these views are Jacob Emden, Eliyahu Soloveitchik, and Elijah Benamozegh.

Moses Mendelssohn, as well as some other religious thinkers of the Jewish Enlightenment, also held more positive views. Austrian-born philosopher Martin Buber also held Jesus in great regard. A positive view of Jesus is fairly represented among modern Jews in the currents of Reform (Emil G. Hirsch and Kaufmann Kohler), Conservative (Milton Steinberg and Byron Sherwin,), and Jewish Renewal (Zalman Schachter-Shalomi).

Some modern Orthodox rabbis, such as Irving Greenberg and Jonathan Sacks, also hold positive views (Greenberg theorizes Jesus as "a messiah but not The Messiah").

Rabbi Shmuley Boteach takes this even farther, following the research of Hyam Maccoby. Boteach authored Kosher Jesus in 2012, in which he depicts Jesus as "a Jewish patriot murdered by Rome for his struggle on behalf of his people." Opinions of the merits of the book differ, with Israeli-American Rabbi Yechiel Eckstein, President of the International Fellowship of Christians and Jews, praising it as "courageous and thought-provoking". Boteach said that the book "traces the teachings of Jesus to their original sources: the Torah, the Talmud and rabbinic literature".

See also
 Christian–Jewish reconciliation
 Christ myth theory
 Judaism's views on Muhammad
 Jesus in Islam
 Jews for Jesus
 List of messiah claimants
 Messianic Judaism
 Milhamoth ha-Shem
 Opposition to Christianity in Chazalic literature
 The Book of Nestor the Priest (Sefer Nestor Ha-Komer)
 Sefer Nizzahon Yashan
 Sefer Joseph Hamekane
 The Touchstone of Ibn Shaprut

References

External links
 The False Prophet
 
 Jewish Encyclopedia: False Prophet

Jesus in Judaism
Christ myth theory
Criticism of Christianity
Christianity and Judaism related controversies
Talmud people